Wian Vosloo (born 15 February 1995) is a South African rugby union player for the  in the Currie Cup. His regular position is flanker.

References

South African rugby union players
Living people
1995 births
People from Paarl
Rugby union flankers
Sharks (Currie Cup) players
Sharks (rugby union) players
Blue Bulls players
Bulls (rugby union) players
Rugby union players from the Western Cape